Edgemon is a surname. Notable people with the surname include:

Luke Edgemon, singer
Darcie Edgemon (born 1980), American author